Sri Rangaraja Puram  mandal is one of the 31 mandals in Chittoor district in the Indian state of Andhra Pradesh. It is a part of Nagari revenue division.

References 

Mandals in Chittoor district